The 2006–07 Atlanta Hawks season was the 58th season of the franchise in the National Basketball Association (NBA) and the 39th in Atlanta. The Hawks had the fifth overall pick in the 2006 NBA draft, and selected Shelden Williams out of Duke University. During the offseason, the team signed free agent Speedy Claxton and re-signed former Hawks center Lorenzen Wright. The Hawks got off to a strong start winning four of their first five games. However, the lack of talent on the court continued to weigh down the Hawks as they entered the New Year with a 9–20 record, including an 8-game losing streak. In January, they posted a winning record as they won 8 of their 15 games during the month. Joe Johnson averaged 25.0 points per game and was selected for the 2007 NBA All-Star Game. However, after the All-Star break, Johnson would miss the remainder of the season due to calf injuries after 57 games.

At midseason, the team re-signed free agent, and former Hawks guard Anthony Johnson, who would play in his third stint with the Hawks, who finished last place in the Southeast Division with a 30–52 record, missing the playoffs for the eighth straight season. Josh Smith showed improvement averaging 16.4 points, 8.6 rebounds, and 2.9 blocks per game, while second-year forward Marvin Williams provided the team with 13.1 points and 5.3 rebounds per game. This would be the final season that the Hawks missed the playoffs until 2018.

Draft picks

Roster

Regular season

Standings

Record vs. opponents

Game log

Player statistics

Season

Awards and records

Transactions

References

Atlanta Hawks seasons
Atlanta Haw
Atlanta Haw
Atlanta Hawks